Stuck on You is a 2003 American comedy film screenwritten and directed by the Farrelly brothers, and starring Matt Damon and Greg Kinnear as conjoined twin brothers, whose conflicting aspirations provide both conflict and humorous situations, in particular when one of them wishes to move to Hollywood to pursue a career as an actor.

Plot
Conjoined twins Bob and Walt Tenor try to live as normally as possible. Outgoing and sociable Walt aspires to be a Hollywood actor, whereas Bob is shy and introverted.

The twins run Quikee Burger, a diner in Oak Bluffs on Martha's Vineyard, guaranteeing free meals if orders are not completed in three minutes, showing how skilled and in sync Bob and Walt are. Walt is comfortable interacting with women, but Bob is shyer. He has a long-distance relationship with pen pal May Fong from California, whom he has never met and hasn't told he is a conjoined twin.

Walt stars in a one man show, while Bob stays as much as possible in the background, as he has stage fright. As the play's successful, Walt follows his dream to Hollywood, persuading his hesitant brother to go along for the ride.

They rent an apartment in California and become friends with fellow aspiring actress April Mercedes. When she asks about their conjoinment, Walt explains they share a liver that is mostly Bob's. As surgical separation is risky for Walt, Bob would not consent to the surgery, even though Walt wanted it. It is also why Walt looks older than Bob.

Walt has difficulty finding acting work in Hollywood, and his agent, Morty O'Reilly, isn't helpful, offering at one point to get him a job in a pornographic film. Cher is upset that she is starring in a prime-time TV show called Honey and the Beaze. Wanting out, she hires Walt as her co-star, certain it will get cancelled. The producers realize her scheme and foil it by going forward, compensating for Bob's presence by keeping him out of the camera frame and employing bluescreen effects. The show is a surprise hit and Walt becomes famous.

Walt arranges for May Fong to meet Bob without his consent. They develop a romantic relationship, though the twins' attempt to keep their conjoined nature a secret proves challenging, especially as Walt must accompany them everywhere, sometimes using creative solutions like disguising himself as a giant teddy bear. Eventually, when May discovers them in bed, she concludes they are a gay couple rather than brothers. Although Bob shows her they are indeed conjoined twins, shocked at the lie, she flees.

Morty informs the twins that word has leaked about Walt and Bob being conjoined. Rather than hide this, they embrace it, becoming huge celebrities, making commercials and appearing on The Tonight Show with Jay Leno. While Walt enjoys this success, he knows that Bob is unhappy and misses May. Resolving that Bob needs to be independent to be happy, Walt demands they be surgically separated.

Bob refuses, so Walt acts wild and crazy. Drunk, he snatches a woman's purse and spends the night in jail for drunk driving. Although Walt was drinking, Bob has the hangover, as their shared liver is mostly his. Released the following morning, they fight and Bob agrees to the operation.

On the night before the surgery, May shows up, apologizing to Bob for running out. He informs her that they're getting separated; although she does not want them to, he says it's best. At the hospital, May and April wait until Ben Carson, a real-life neurosurgeon in a cameo, that the surgery was successful.

Bob and May, small-town people, move back to Oak Bluffs, but Bob finds the separation from Walt difficult, both practically and emotionally, and has difficulty doing things by himself they used to do together, such as maintain Quikee Burger's three-minute challenge or play hockey. Walt loses his job when Honey and the Beaze is canceled due to low ratings, and doesn't find more work. He is also emotionally devastated by Bob's absence. After a brief talk with Cher about what's best for him, he moves back to Oak Bluffs.

One year later, Walt and Bob are running the restaurant together, Bob and May have married and May is pregnant. The twins simulate their former conjoinment with Velcro clothing that attaches them. Walt finds creative fulfillment continuing in local plays, including a musical in which he and Meryl Streep play Bonnie and Clyde.

Cast
 Matt Damon as Bob Tenor
 Greg Kinnear as Walt Tenor
 Cher as herself
 Eva Mendes as April Mercedes
 Wen Yann Shih as May Fong
 Pat Crawford Brown as Mimmy
 Ray Valliere as Rocket
 Tommy Songin as Tommy
 Terence Bernie Hines as Moe Neary
 Jackie Flynn as Howard
 Seymour Cassel as Morty O'Reilly
 Stephen Saux as drive-by heckler
 Danny Murphy as Dicky
 Steve Tyler as Detective Reney
 Dane Cook as Officer Fraioli
 Lin Shaye as Makeup Babe
 Bella Thorne as MV Sideline (uncredited)
 Tracy Ashton as Casting Agent #2
 Jessica Cauffiel as Debbie

Cameo appearances
 Griffin Dunne
 Jay Leno
 Ricky Williams
 Ben Carson (as "head surgeon")
 Cameron Diaz (uncredited)
 Mary Hart (uncredited)
 Fernanda Lima
 Frankie Muniz (uncredited)
 Meryl Streep
 Luke Wilson as himself
 Jesse Ventura (uncredited)
 Tom Brady (uncredited)
 Lawyer Milloy (uncredited)

Music
The song "Human" recorded by Cher, who appears in the film, and produced by David Kahne was included in the soundtrack (Flynn cover). There was no official release, but in Germany the song was released on a promotional CD of the soundtrack called "Unzertrennlich" and that version clocks 3:49. The original 4:25 version was never released. The song can be heard during the end credits of the film and is played during a scene in a club. This is the first Farrelly Brothers film not to have an official soundtrack.

The song "Moonlight Feels Right" by Starbuck, written and produced by lead singer/keyboardist Bruce Blackman also appears in the film.

Pete Yorn recorded a cover of the Albert Hammond classic "It Never Rains in Southern California" for the film, and like the aforementioned Cher song, remains unreleased. The Kings of Leon songs "California Waiting", "Molly's Chambers" and "Holy Roller Novocaine" all are featured in the film, as well, from the band's first EP, Holy Roller Novacaine.

Greg Kinnear's version of "Summertime" is an almost note-for-note cover of the Billy Stewart version, and was also sampled in Rihanna's song "Cockiness (Love It)". Eight minutes out in the movie, while at a bar, Morten Abel's song "Welcome Home" is played.

The country song played over the closing credits The Fear of Being Alone is sung by George Schappell (credited as Reba), one of a set of conjoined twins who is mentioned in the film.

Reception

Critical response
Review website Rotten Tomatoes gives the film a score of 61% based on 158 reviews, and an average rating of 6/10, with the consensus: "An unusually sweet and charming comedy by the Farrelly brothers. Fans may miss the distinct lack of bodily fluids though." On Metacritic, the film has a weighted average score of 62 out of 100, based on 37 critics, indicating "generally favorable reviews". Audiences polled by CinemaScore gave the film an average grade of "B-" on an A+ to F scale.

Box office
The film broke even on its $55 million production budget with $65,784,503 worldwide, its box office draw considerably underperformed the Farrelly Brothers' previous hits. It only managed third place in its opening weekend box office (US) despite having the largest theater count of any release that weekend (December 12–14, 2003).

Notes

References

External links

 
 
 
 
 

2003 films
2000s English-language films
2000s buddy comedy films
2003 romantic comedy films
American romantic comedy films
Fictional conjoined twins
American buddy comedy films
Films about actors
Films set in Martha's Vineyard
Films shot in Florida
American comedy-drama films
Films shot in Massachusetts
20th Century Fox films
Films directed by the Farrelly brothers
Films about twin brothers
Films with screenplays by the Farrelly brothers
Twins in fiction
2000s American films